Moonlight and Cactus is a 1944 American musical Western film featuring The Andrews Sisters. The screenplay concerns a ranch owner whose cattle are stolen.

Plot
United States Merchant Marine Tom Garrison is the owner of a ranch being run by the Andrew Sisters, and all his cattle have been stolen. He hires neighbor Pasqualito Luigi to find the missing livestock.

Cast
Patty Andrews – Herself
Maxene Andrews – Herself
Laverne Andrews – Herself
Leo Carrillo – Pasqualito Luigi
Tom Seidel – Tom Garrison
Elyse Knox - Louise Ferguson
Shemp Howard - Punchy Carter

References

External links
 
 
 
 

1944 films
American black-and-white films
American musical drama films
1940s musical drama films
American Western (genre) films
1944 Western (genre) films
American Western (genre) musical films
1940s Western (genre) musical films
1944 drama films
Universal Pictures films
1940s English-language films
1940s American films